The Hugo media franchise includes numerous video games either based on or inspired by the interactive television game show of the same title originally developed by the Danish company ITE Media. Dozens of Hugo games spanning different genres have been released for various platforms in many international localizations since 1990, having sold over 10 million copies as for 2008.

Classic Hugo series 

Between 1992 to 2000, ITE Media adapted their classic Hugo TV show into more than a dozen various compilations of different scenarios for several computer and console platforms. They were also rearranged for some of the Classic Hugo re-releases during the 2000s.

Hugo: Jungle Island series 

Several video game adaptations of the television game show of the same title have been developed and published by ITE Media during the early 2000s.

Agent Hugo series

The Agent Hugo series was a James Bond parody themed reboot of the Hugo franchise developed and published by ITE Media. The original Agent Hugo was released only in Europe in 2005, followed by Agent Hugo: Roborumble in 2006, Agent Hugo - Lemoon Twist in 2007, and Agent Hugo: Hula Holiday in 2008. Unlike the classic Hugo games, the games in the series were not compilations of simple scenarios from the television show, but full fledged third-person perspective action games similar to some of the earlier standalone Hugo games.

Other Hugo games by ITE

Skærmtrolden Hugo
The first Hugo game, based on the original Hugo television show Eleva2ren, was developed by Thomas Villadsen and Uffe Jakobsen for SilverRock Productions  (later Interactive Television Entertainment and ITE Media). Skærmtrolden Hugo was originally released for the Commodore 64 and Amiga computers before Christmas 1990 and internationally (as just Hugo in the English language version) in 1991, and was then ported to the PC DOS shortly afterwards. The game takes place in an old gold mine filled with dangers, which Hugo has to navigate to find a treasure room. Its gameplay mechanics are very simple and completing the entire game may take less than ten minutes.

Hugo: Winter Games
A collection of Christmas-themed minigames published in 1997 for the PC. Also known as Hugo: PC Calendar or Christmas CD-ROM,  the game wss originally released in Denmark as Hugo i Sneen (Hugo in the Snow). In it, Scylla has placed a curse on Santa's Christmas Village and the only one who can thwart her is Hugo. By completing 24 various minigames representing each day of December before Christmas Eve, the troll must lift the witch's spell and then finally confront and freeze her.

Hugo Saves Christmas
A collection of Christmas-themed minigames published for the PC in 1998. In the game, Hugo comes to again foil Scylla's newest plot to ruin Christmas Eve for the children everywhere. This time round, he has to save Santa Claus from being imprisoned in the witch's main residence, the Skull Castle, and claim the entire place for Santa by replacing its dark themes with Christmas decorations and eventually defeating Scylla. Also known as Hugo: PC Calendar, the game was released in Denmark as Hugo Redder Julen, in Germany as Hugo rettet das Weihnachtsfest, in Argentine as Hugo salva la Navidad, and in Russia as Кузя спасает Рождество. It was re-released as part of Trollbox 1 (packaged together with Hugo 5 and Stinky & Biber) in 2000.

Hugo: The Magic Oak
A collection of education minigames published for the PC in 1999. It was the first game starring Hugo's infant son Rat as the main character as Scylla's magic sends him deep into the Troll Forest from where the player must guide him back to his family. It is also known as Hugo: Learn & Play, and as Hugo: Den Fortryllede Eg / Hugo: Leg Og Lær 1 in Denmark, Hugo: Tajemný les in Czechia, Hugo: Taikatammi in Finland, Hugo: El roble mágico en Argentina, Hugo: Die Zaubereiche in Germany, Hugo: Zaczarowany dąb in Poland, Hugo: Sihirli Meşe in Turkey, and Кузя и его друзья: Волшебное дерево in Russia.

Scylla's Revenge
In this PC collection of minigames, the hateful witch Scylla has returned once again in a Christmas setting but this time she attempts to rid of Santa Claus and all the elves forever. She has cast a cruel spell trapping them all in ice blocks and they are now in danger of freezing inside unless Hugo can save them in time. The game was released in Denmark as Hugo: Afskylias Hævn, and was also released in Germany as Hugo Wintergames 3, in Poland as Hugo: Gwiazdkowa przygoda (Hugo: Christmas Adventure) and in Russia as Кузя: Новый год (Kuzya/Hugo: New Year).

Hugo in the Hut
A 2000 game for the PC.Hugo: Quest for the Sunstones

Hugo: Black Diamond Fever

Hugo: Frog Fighter
A 2001 game for the PC.

Hugo: New Year
Originally titled Кузя: Новый год, it is Russian 2D platform video game for Windows published by ITE and MediaHouse in 2001.

Hugo: The Bewitched Rollercoaster
In this 2001 PC collection of minigames, Scylla destroys the electrical power source at the amusement park in an attempt to spoil Hugo's children's good time. Hugo's son Rat and the fly Buzzy embark on a quest through time and space (including the Ancient Egypt, the Wild West, the Stone Age, the Middle Ages, and the ancient Rome) to find the items that would enable them to repair the rollercoaster and help their father get revenge on the witch. It was titled Hugo: Den Forheksede Rutschebane / Hugo: Leg Og Lær 3 in Denmark, Hugo: Taikavuoristorata in Finland, Hugo: Die verhexte Achterbahn in Germany, Hugo: Zaklęta Kolejka in Poland, and Кузька: Путешественник во времени (Kuzya/Hugo: Time traveler) in Russia.

Hugo: The Magic Journey
In this 2001 PC educational game, Hugo's daughter goes on a journey to find a treasure lost by her ancestors when they have been attacked by Scylla centuries ago. It was titled Hugo: Den Magiske Rejse / Hugo: Leg Og Lær 2 in Denmark, Hugo: Cesta kolem světa (Around the World) in Czechia, Hugo: Fantastische Welt in Germany, Hugo Taikamatka in Finland, Hugo: Magiczna podróż in Poland, Hugo Sihirli Yolculuk in Turkey, and Кузя и его друзья: Большое путешествие (Kuzya/Hugo and His Fiends: A Great Trip) in Russia. The game was seen as scandalous by some in Turkey due to its depiction of the country.

Hugo: The Secrets of the Forest
In this 2002 PC educational game compilation of eight minigames, Scylla transforms a class of bunny children into stone while she searches the woods for a rare mushroom that she needs for her magic spells. Using a scroll that Scylla dropped, Hugo's daughter Ruth needs to collect ingredients to create an antidote to the evil enchantment. It was also titled Hugo: Den Magiske Trylledrik / Hugo: Leg Og Lær 4 in Denmark, Hugo Taikajuoma in Finland, Hugo: Der magische Zaubertrank in Germany, Hugo: Magiczny napój in Poland, Hugo: Ormanın Büyüsü in Turkey, and Волшебный Эликсир in Russia.

Hugo: The Forces of Nature
An educational game published for the PC in 2002. In this game, Scylla has left her lair for the witches' congress, leaving Don Croco alone with her book of spells. A resulting outbreak of magic unleashes a series of natural disasters the island where the Kikurians live. It is up to Hugo to stand up against the forces of nature and in the end to battle the returning Scylla as well. It was titled Hugo: Naturens Kræfter / Hugo: Leg Og Lær 6 in Denmark, Hugo: Sila prírody in Czechia, Hugo ja luonnonvoimat in Finland, Hugo im Bann der Elemente in Germany, Hugo: Siły natury in Poland, Hugo: Naturkrafterna in Sweden, Hugo: Doğanın Güçleri in Turkey, and Силы природы in Russia.

Hugo: Heroes of the Savannah
A 2002 educational game for the PC.

Hugo and the Animals of the Ocean
A 2002 educational game for the PC.

Hugo in Space
In this 2002 educational PC game, Scylla and an army of her minions travel to space in search of an asteroid located on the other side of Pluto. Its core of which is composed entirely of the rare black diamonds that would make her infinitely more powerful and turn all the creatures of troll forest into her slaves. Hugo, vacationing with his family in space at the time, once again sets out to thwart her plan, for which they need to complete five missions across the Solar System to collect enough spaceship fuel to fight their way through Scylla's space fleet to reach her mining base and blow it up along with the asteroid, after which they chase after her personal spaceship to destroy it too before she can return to Earth. It was released as Hugo På Rumfart / Hugo: Leg Og Lær 8 in Denmark, Hugo Avaruudessa in Finland, Hugo im Weltraum in Germany,  in Poland, and Кузя в космосе in Russia.

Hugo: The Evil Mirror

Hugo Frog Fighter
A 2002 game for the PlayStation, similar to an advanced version of Frogger.

Hugo: Smakkaball
Published for the PC in 2003. Together with his family, his friends, and even his sworn enemies, Hugo joins a "smakkaball" arena sport tournament. It was released in Russia as Кузя: Троллебол (Kuzya: Trolloboi).

Hugo: Bukkazoom!

Hugo: Runamukka
A 2004 PC top-down action game.

Hugo: Cannon Cruise

Hugo: Penguin Battle
Published in 2005 for the PC. In this game, Scylla uses cloning magic to form an army of evil penguins led by copies of herself and attempts to freeze the entire world to conquer it. It is up to Hugo in his "hugocopter" to melt the ice and restore it, and to stop the witch once again by destroying all of the clones. It was titled Hugo: Schlacht im ewigen Eis (Battle in Eternal Ice) in Germany, Hugo: Bitwa Pingwinów in Poland, and Кузя спасает лето (Hugo/Kuzya Saves Summer) in Russia.

 Non-ITE Hugo games
Hugo (1994 GB game)Hugo for the Game Boy was released by Laguna Video Games as very different title from the 1990s series, despite sharing the same title. The game is actually a conversion of Crazy Castle 2 by Kemco. In the game'a story, Hugo's wife Hugolina is kidnapped by the Horned King, ruler of the castle Arbarus (in the game's more usual in-development story, Hugolina was to be held in the castle by Hugo's archenemy, the witch Scylla), and Hugo has to free her and defeat the King.

Hugo: New Year 2
Originally titled Кузя: Новый год 2, it is 2D platform game developed by NDS Denmark and published by MediaHouse for Windows in 2001.

Hugo: Magic in the Troll Woods
Originally titled Hugo: Magi i Troldeskoven in Denmark (Hugo - Zauberei im Trollwald in Germany, Hugo: Magi i Trollskogen in Sweden), it is a platform game developed by Attractive Games and published by Krea Medie in 2009 for the PS2, Wii, Windows, and Nintendo DS. It was a complete reboot of the series, featuring a different Hugo the troll character as an apprentice sorcerer in another world.

Hugo Troldeakademiet: Den Forsvundne Kæmpe
A 2010 platform game published by Krea Medie for the Nintendo DS in Denmark, besides a Swedish version titled Hugo: Den Försvunna Jätten. It is the first sequel to Hugo: Magic in the Troll Woods.

Hugo Troldeakademiet: Kampen om Krystalkortet
Also known as Hugo: Jakten på Kristallkartan, it is a 2010 game published by Krea Medie for the Nintendo DS as the third enreuy in their abortive reboot series.

Hugo: Game Factory
Originally titled Hugo Spielewerkstatt (other titles include Hugo: Fabryka Gier in Poland), it is a simple 2D platform game creator developed by Krea Medie and originally published by UIG Entertainment in December 2010.

Hugo: The Adventure with English
An educational video game for Windows originally published in Russia by MediaHouse. A Polish version was released by Cenega as Hugo: Przygoda z angielskim.

Hugo: The Adventure with English 2
A Russian educational video game for Windows published by MediaHouse.

Hugo: De Första Tecknen
Swedish title of the video game published by Krea Medie for Windows in 2010 (Finnish title: Hugo: Ensimmäiset Merkit).

Hugo: Utmaningen i Tornet
Swedish title of a platform game published by Krea Medie for Weindows in 2010 (Finnish title: Hugo: Tornin Arvoitus).

Hugo Retro Mania

Hugo Troll Race

Hugo World
A social management game published by Hugo Games. The game is set in a traditional Hugo universe and the classic characters such as Hugo's wife Hugolina and their children return along with Scylla and her companion Don Croco.

Hugo Troll Wars
A Clash of Clans style free-to-play online real-time strategy / tower defense hybrid published by Hugo Games for a variety of platforms, including Kindle, Android, iOS, Windows and Facebook. The game is set in alternate Hugo universe, where the players take role of a commander for either Hugo, the King of Trolls, or his mortal enemy Scylla, the evil Queen of Witches in the eternal conflict between the two sides. It features a PvP multiplayer mode and social game elements.

Ronaldo & Hugo: Superstar Skaters
A free-to-play endless runner mobile game developed by Fuzzy-Frog Games and published by Hugo Games for Android and iOS, featuring the football star Cristiano Ronaldo.

Hugo Flower Flush 
A  tile-matching video game published by Hugo Games and soft-launched for the iOS and Android in 2015. In it, Hugo and Hugolina must collect find the rare Enchanted Flower before Scylla can use them as ingredient for an evil spell.

Hugo Troll Race 2: Rail Rush
A follow-up to the original Hugo Troll Race, an endless runner game developed by Fuzzy-Frog Games and published by 5th Planet Games in 2016 for Android and iOS. In this clone of Subway Surfers, the player controls either Hugo or Hugolina attempting to rescue the other from being kidnapped. The game's two constantly alternating stages have the chosen troll either driving a mine cart to chase after the broom-flying Scylla, or running away from the witch to defeat her with a successfully deflected spell.

Hugo Adventure: The Mystery Islands
Originally announced as Hugo Mystery Island.

Hugo (2016)
An online slot game developed by 5th Planet Games and published by Play'n GO on August 16, 2016. Like Hugo Retro Mania'', the game is based on the minigame scenarios "Labyrinth" and the endgame "Ropes" from the original TV show and some classic games.

Hugo 2 (2018)
An online slot game developed by 5th Planet Games and published by Play'n GO on November 23, 2018. It is an adaptation of the scenario "Ice Cave" from the TV show and some of the classic games.

Hugo Goal
An online slot game developed by 5th Planet Games and published by Play'n GO on May 31, 2018.

Hugo's Adventure
An online slot game developed by 5th Planet Games and published by Play'n GO on September 5, 2019.

Hugo Carts
An online slot game developed by 5th Planet Games and published by Play'n GO on August 25, 2021.

Hugo: Up & Away
An online multiplayer crash game developed  by Spearhead Studios and published by FunFair Games in partnership with copyright holder 5th Planet Games on September 29, 2022.

References

External links
Hugo Games
HugoNet (archived)
Bukkazoom (archived)
Runamukka (archived)
Smakkaball (archived)
Danish listing of Hugo games
 Game finder by platform

Lists of video games by franchise